Saropogon pritchardi is a species of robber flies (insects in the family Asilidae).

References

External links

 

Asilidae
Articles created by Qbugbot
Insects described in 1934